This is a list of notable skateparks.

Builders of skateparks include local skateboarders creating do it yourself / "barge board" parks and firms such as SITE Design Group and Grindline Skateparks.

The first skatepark to receive historic designation was the Bro Bowl, in Florida, listed in the National Register of Historic Places.  The second was The Rom, in east London, England, which is Grade II listed.

Australia
Bill Godfrey Oval
City Sk8 Park, Adelaide
Monster Skatepark, Sydney Olympic Park
Pizzey Park
Snake Run
West Beach Skate Park

Canada
Legacy Skatepark, Ottawa's largest at 
Underpass Park, Toronto
Vancouver Skate Plaza, Vancouver, once named 21st on a top-25 list of world's best skate parks 
Shaw Millennium Skatepark (Calgary, Alberta, Canada) – One of the world's largest outdoor skateparks, designed by Spectrum Skateparks with Landplan associates.

Denmark
Copenhagen Skatepark, Copenhagen
Fælledparken Skatepark, Copenhagen

France
Lorient skatepark, Lorient, from the 70s, still open in 2019
Palais omnisports Marseille Grand-Est, Marseille (billed as Europe's largest indoor skatepark as of 2009) 
Beton Hurlant, Paris, from the 70s
La Villette, Paris, from the 70s
Prime Paris, Paris, from the 70s
Erromardie, Saint-Jean-de-Luz, from the 70s
Saintes skatepark, Saintes, from the 70s, still open in 2019
La Roche-sur-Yon skatepark, La Roche-sur-Yon, from the 70s, still open in 2019

Germany
Mellowpark, Berlin

India
Desert Dolphin Skatepark, Khempur, Rajasthan.

Jordan
7Hills Skatepark, Amman

Malaysia
Pasir Gudang Skate Park in Johor, Malaysia.

Netherlands
Area 51 (skatepark), Eindhoven. One of largest in Europe.

North Korea
 Pyongyang Skatepark, the first skatepark in North Korea.

Portugal
 Chelas skatepark, was inaugurated in 2013, Chelas, Portugal
 Parque Das Gerações skatepark, was inaugurated in 2013, São João do Estoril, Portugal

Philippines
Koronodal Skate Park in Koronadal, Cotabato
Mountain Dew Skate Park in Makati
Tagaytay Extreme Sports Complex in Tagaytay, Cavite. The venue for skateboarding at the 2019 Southeast Asian Games.

Serbia
Bor Skate Plaza, in Bor. Largest skate park in the Balkans.

Slovenia
Skate park Rog ("Skejt park Rog") – the first covered skate park in Slovenia, at Rog (factory)

Sweden
Stapelbäddsparken in Malmö.

United Kingdom
The Buszy
Harrow Skate Park – Harrow, UK
Playing Place, an historic skatepark in a small Cornish village
Radlands
Rampworx skatepark, Liverpool. The largest indoor venue in the UK, covering .
The Rom (1978), Grade II listed skatepark in Hornchurch, east London, England.
Stockwell Skatepark – South London, UK

United States

Alabama
City Walk Skatepark (2022), Birmingham, Alabama. Largest skatepark in the Southeastern United States and the fifth largest skatepark in the United States. This skatepark is apart if the Birmingham's City Walk that spans more than 10 blocks and over 31 acres.

Arizona
Surf City (1965), Tucson, Arizona. Asserted to be first skatepark in the world Operated by Arizona Surf City Enterprises, Inc., it had concrete ramps.

California
Carlsbad Skatepark (1976), Carlsbad.  California's first skatepark.  Home of World Skateboard Championships on April 10, 1977.  Operated until 1979, then buried, then destroyed in 2005.  The current Carlsbad Skatepark is elsewhere.
Pier Avenue Junior High School skatepark (1999), Hermosa Beach.  Opened by the city, a small skatepark at the site of the first skateboard competition, which was organized by Dewey Weber across the street from his surf and skateboard shop. Makaha Skateboards was a sponsor of the competition. School is now a museum.
 etnies Skatepark, Lake Forest – Largest free skatepark in California. .
 Santa Maria Skate Park – Fletcher Park. 700 Southside Pkwy, Santa Maria, California.
 The Palm Springs Skatepark contains a replica of the Nude Bowl, which is the most popular feature in the park.

Connecticut
CT Bike (1987), Bristol, Connecticut.  All wooden indoor skate park, still in business today, despite a 1988 fire, operated by same family.  Where Tony Hawk "made his debut when he was just a young boy on his first East Coast tour."

Florida
Kona Skatepark in Jacksonville, Florida.  One of few private parks of the 1970s surviving.
Bro Bowl – One of the last skateparks of the 70s, and one of the oldest skateparks in the U.S.; First public skatepark in Florida Tampa, Florida.  Listed on the National Register of Historic Places
 Possum Creek – Gainesville, Florida.
 Skatepark of Tampa – Skatepark in Tampa and home of the annual Tampa Pro.

Iowa
 Davenport Skatepark – Davenport, Iowa.
 Lauridsen Skatepark http://www.dsmskatepark.com – Des Moines, Iowa. The largest skatepark in the United States at 88,000 square feet. (8175 square meters)
 Knoxville Skatepark - 502 N Lincoln Street, Knoxville, Iowa  50138

Kentucky
 Louisville Extreme Park – Louisville, Kentucky.

Maryland
Ocean Bowl Skate Park (1976), Ocean City, Maryland, first on East Coast, and oldest operating municipal skate park in the United States.  Renovated/rebuilt in 1997–98.

New Mexico
Alamosa Skatepark Environment, Albuquerque, New Mexico.

New York

Ohio
 Skatopia – Anarchist Skatepark in Rutland, Ohio
The Flow Skatepark (2001-2013), Columbus. Was a world-famous[1] skatepark. It was voted #1 skatepark in the United States by Fuel TV.

Oregon
Burnside Skatepark, a do it yourself "barge build" beneath the Burnside Bridge in Portland, Oregon.  The modern skatepark designs of the Pacific Northwest can be traced back to this. Skateboarders used an area populated primarily by the city's "undesirable elements" to create a skatepark, building one section at a time. The process is called "design/build" (D/B), and is a characteristic of many skateparks today. The design/build process ensures that adjacent skatepark features are harmonious and rideable, allowing skateboarders to create endless "lines" to ride among the many features.
 Burnside Skatepark, Portland, Oregon featured in Tony Hawk video games and the movie Paranoid Park.
Ashland Skate Park (1999), Ashland.  It's a "rad and versatile" park. It was amidst some contention about families and surveillance cameras in 2018.

Pennsylvania
 FDR Skatepark – Philadelphia, Pennsylvania

Tennessee
Concrete Wave Country – Nashville's first public skatepark.

Texas
 Lee and Joe Jamail Skatepark –  in-ground public facility in Houston, Texas.

Virginia

8 Mount Trashmore Skatepark, in Virginia Beach

Washington
 Edge Skatepark – Redmond, Washington
A skatepark (1966), Kelso, Washington. For skateboarders and skaters, with plywood ramps, lighted for night use.

Wisconsin
 Turf Skatepark (1979), Milwaukee.  Included five concrete pools in an indoor/outdoor facility (defunct since 1996).

to be processed
In more extreme climates, parks were built indoors, often using wood or metal. By the end of the 1970s, the popularity of skateboarding had waned, and the original parks of the era began to close. A downturn in the overall skateboard market in the 1980s, coupled with high liability insurance premiums, contributed to the demise of the first wave of skateparks. Some second-generation parks, such as Upland, California's Pipeline, survived into the 1980s.  However, many public parks of that era can still be found throughout Western Europe, Australia and New Zealand.

Gallery of Skateparks

References